The Ho-Ping Power Company (HPC) is an independent power producer company in Taiwan. The company is the subsidiary of Taiwan Cement Corporation and One Energy Holdings Limited.

Activities
HPC participates in the Greenhouse Gas Inventory and Verification Trial Plan promoted by the Energy Bureau of the Ministry of Economic Affairs and the 'Greenhouse Gas Registration, Verification and Voluntary Reduction Trial Plan by the Environmental Protection Administration.

Power plants
 Hoping Power Plant in Xiulin Township, Hualien County

See also

 List of companies of Taiwan
 Electricity sector in Taiwan
 List of power stations in Taiwan

References

External links
  

Energy companies established in 1997
Electric power companies of Taiwan
Taiwanese companies established in 1997